Oyenuga is a surname of Yoruba origin, meaning "the title owns the palace".
Notable people with the surname include:

 Adey Oyenuga, Procurement Administrator @ Chapman University
 Kudus Oyenuga, English footballer
 Victor Adenuga Oyenuga, Nigerian Professor Emeritus of Agricultural science and pioneer President of the Nigerian Academy of Science.

Yoruba-language surnames